Our Lady of Mount Carmel School (OLMC) is a Roman Catholic-PreKindergarten through 12 school in Essex, Baltimore County, Maryland. It is located within the Roman Catholic Archdiocese of Baltimore.

Description 
The school was established in 1959 to serve the students of Our Lady of Mount Carmel Parish and surrounding Essex-Middle River Community. As of 2019, the school had 536 students.

See also

National Catholic Educational Association

References

Educational institutions established in 1959
Essex, Maryland
Private K-12 schools in Maryland
Catholic secondary schools in Maryland
Private schools in Baltimore County, Maryland
1959 establishments in Maryland